The Aura A35 is an American sailboat that was designed by Sparkman & Stephens as a cruiser-racer and first built in 1975.

The A35 is a version of Sparkman & Stephens's design 2166, as are the Hughes 35, North Star 1500 and the SHE 36.

Production
The design was built by Aura Yachts in the United States, starting in 1975, but it is now out of production.

Design
The A35 is a recreational keelboat, built predominantly of fiberglass, with wood trim. It has a masthead sloop rig, a skeg-mounted rudder and a fixed fin keel. It displaces  and carries  of ballast.

See also
List of sailing boat types

Related development
 Hughes 35
 North Star 1500
 SHE 36

References

Keelboats
1970s sailboat type designs
Sailing yachts
Sailboat type designs by Sparkman and Stephens
Sailboat types built by Aura Yachts